The 2014 Southeastern Conference women's basketball tournament was the postseason women's basketball tournament for the Southeastern Conference (SEC), beginning on March 5, 2014, and ending on March 9, 2014 in Duluth, Georgia, at the Arena at Gwinnett Center. While it determined the SEC's representative in the NCAA tournament, it did not determine the official SEC champion; the conference has awarded its official championship solely on the basis of regular-season record since the 1985–86 season.

Format
Although the SEC expanded to 14 members with the addition of Missouri and Texas A&M in July 2012, this was the first SEC women's tournament to feature 14 teams. Ole Miss did not participate in the 2013 tournament; it self-imposed a postseason ban for the 2012–13 season after revelations of potential major NCAA rules violations.

The teams seeded 1–4 received a double-bye to the quarterfinals, and the teams seeded 5–10 received a single-bye to the second round.  The remaining four teams played in the first round.

Seeds

Schedule

SPSO games air across the SEC Region on FSN affiliates, including FSSW, and FSMW. The games rotate between the main channel and Plus affiliates. The games are also simulcast outside SEC territories on ESPN3. Next year the majority of the games will move to SEC Network.

Bracket

OT denotes overtime game

References

SEC women's basketball tournament
2013–14 Southeastern Conference women's basketball season
SEC Women's basketball
SEC women's basketball tournament